USS Christopher (DE-100) was a Cannon class destroyer escort built for the United States Navy. She served only a short time in the Atlantic Ocean before being transferred to Brazil, in December 1944. She was renamed NAe Benevente (D-20) and was finally retired and scrapped in 1964.

History
USS Christopher was named for a Navy Cross recipient, Harold Jensen Christopher, who was killed at Pearl Harbor aboard  on 7 December 1941.

She was launched 19 June 1943 by Dravo Corp., Wilmington, Delaware; sponsored by Mrs. Carl Christopher, mother of Ensign Christopher. D100 commissioned 23 October 1943.

U.S. Navy (1943-1944)
Christopher sailed from Philadelphia, Pennsylvania, 25 December 1943 for duty off Brazil and to Trinidad on training exercises in convoys and on screening cruisers during their shakedown and training periods. Between 16 January and 11 February, she sailed off Montevideo, screening the British cable ship Cambria as she repaired broken cables.

Brazilian Navy (1944-1964)

Similar duty continued until Christopher was decommissioned at Natal, Brazil, 19 December 1944, and loaned to Brazil under lend-lease. She was renamed Benevente (D-20) in Brazilian service. On 30 June 1953, when the loan ended, she was stricken from the U.S Navy List and transferred to Brazil under the Mutual Assistance Program.

She was stricken and scrapped in 1964.

Awards

References

External links

 

Ships built in Wilmington, Delaware
1943 ships
Cannon-class destroyer escorts of the United States Navy
Bertioga-class destroyer escorts
Cannon-class destroyer escorts of the Brazilian Navy
World War II frigates of Brazil
World War II frigates and destroyer escorts of the United States